Disney General Entertainment Content (DGEC), formerly Capital Cities/ABC, Inc., ABC Group, Disney–ABC Television Group and the second incarnation of Walt Disney Television, is part of Disney Entertainment, a division of The Walt Disney Company that oversees its owned-and-operated television content, assets and sub-divisions.

Following the full acquisition of 21st Century Fox by Disney on March 20, 2019, the division was given the unification name Walt Disney Television and rebranded two years later as Disney General Entertainment Content. Sub-divisions of DGEC include the American Broadcasting Company, ABC News, Disney Branded Television, Disney Television Studios, ABC Signature, ABC Family Worldwide, Hulu Original Content Teams as well as assets acquired from 21st Century Fox and then fully integrated, i.e. FX Networks, FX Productions, 20th Television and 20th Television Animation.

History

ABC Group
Media conglomerate Capital Cities/ABC Inc. merged into The Walt Disney Company in 1996 and was initially re-branded as ABC Group. Acquired assets from the merged company included ABC Television Network Group, CC/ABC Broadcasting Group (ABC Radio Network, 8 TV and 21 radio stations), ABC Cable and International Broadcast Group, CC/ABC Publishing Group and CC/ABC Multimedia Group to the fold. The Cable and International Broadcast Group contained ownership shares of ESPN Inc. (80%), A&E Television Networks (37.5%), DIC Productions, L.P. (Limited Partnership stake), Lifetime Television (50%) and its international investments. These investments included Telephone-München (50%, Germany; included 20% of RTL II), Hamster Productions. (33%, France) and Scandinavian Broadcasting System (23%, Luxembourg). ESPN also had international holdings: Eurosport (33.3%, England), TV Sport (10%, France; Eurosport affiliate) and The Japan Sports Channel (20%). The Publishing Group including Fairchild Publications, Chilton Publications, multiple newspapers from a dozen dailies (including the Ft. Worth Star-Telegram, The Kansas City Star) and more weeklies, and dozens more publications in the fields of farm, business and law trade journals plus LA Magazine to Institutional Investor. ABC Group pursued businesses in new and emerging media technologies, including the interactive television, pay-per-view, VOD, HDTV, video cassette, Optical disc, on-line services and location-based entertainment.

In April 1996, due to the ongoing post Disney-CC/ABC merger realignment and retirement of its president, the Walt Disney Television and Telecommunications group's division was reassigned to other groups with Walt Disney Television International (including Disney Channels International and Buena Vista Television domestic syndication and pay-TV divisions, GMTV and Super RTL holdings) were transferred to Capital Cities/ABC. In May due to the merger, ABC ended its ABC Productions division operations while keeping its boutique production companies: Victor Television, DIC Productions, L.P., ABC/Kane Productions and Greengrass Productions. The international operations of Disney TV International and ABC Cable and International Broadcast Group were merged in June as Disney/ABC International Television.

Under Disney, ABC Group sold various publishing companies in 1997. Chilton was sold to Reed Elsevier for $447 million and received $142 million from Euromoney Publications for Institutional Investor. In April, Knight Ridder purchased four newspapers including The Kansas City Star and The Fort Worth Star-Telegram for $1.65 billion. In August 1999, Fairchild Publications was sold to Conde Nast Publications for $650 million. In March 1998, ABC placed it shares of Scandinavian Broadcasting System up for sale.

In late 1999, Walt Disney Television, along with other television units, were transferred again from The Walt Disney Studios to Disney–ABC Television Group and merged with ABC's primetime division, ABC Entertainment, forming ABC Entertainment Group.  Robert A. Iger was promoted from president and chief operating officer in February 1999 to chairman of ABC Group and president of Walt Disney International.

In March 2000, ABC formed the Disney Kids Network (DKN) advertising group via consolidation to sell ads for ABC's "TGIF" primetime programming, Disney's One Saturday Morning, the Disney's One Too syndicated programming block, Who Wants to Be a Millionaire, The Wonderful World of Disney and Winnie the Pooh primetime specials. DKN was placed under senior vice president of sales at ABC, Dan Barnathan, and would also work on some ads with Radio Disney, Disney.com and the Disney Adventures magazine. DKN added Toon Disney when the channel started accepting ads in September 2000.

Iger was named president and chief operating officer of The Walt Disney Company in January 2000. In 2000, with an investment by Bain Capital and Chase Capital Partners, Heyward re-purchased DIC Entertainment, L.P. from Disney, making the company re-independent

In September 2002, then-Disney Chairman/CEO Michael Eisner outlined a proposed realignment of the ABC broadcast network's daytime parts with the similar unit in its cable channels: ABC Saturday mornings with Disney Channel units (Toon Disney & Playhouse Disney), ABC daytime with Soapnet and ABC prime time with ABC Family. In October 2003, ABC Family Worldwide was changed from a unit directly reporting to the Disney COO to a unit running within the ABC Cable Networks Group under Anne Sweeney.

Disney–ABC Television Group

On 21 April 2004, Disney announced a restructuring of its Disney Media Networks division with Sweeney being named president of Disney–ABC Television Group, and then-ESPN president George Bodenheimer becoming co-CEO of the division with Sweeney, as well as president of ABC Sports. This move added ABC TV Network within Disney–ABC. While ABC News Now was launched that year in the US on digital subchannel of 70 ABC owned & operated and affiliates.

On June 12, 2007, Disney spun off its ABC Radio Networks and merged it into Citadel Communications with Citadel Broadcasting while retaining its ESPN Radio and Radio Disney networks and stations and a 10-year news provider licensing agreement with Citadel for ABC News Radio and the networks.

In February 2007, the previous iteration of Touchstone Television was renamed ABC Television Studio as part of Disney's push to drop secondary brands like Buena Vista for Disney, ABC, ESPN, and most recently, A&E Networks.

On January 22, 2009, Disney–ABC announced a merger of ABC Entertainment and ABC Studios into ABC Entertainment Group. That April, ABC Enterprises took an ownership stake in Hulu in exchange for online distribution license and $25 million in the ABC network ad credits. The Live Well Network (LWN) was launched on April 27, 2009 by ABC Owned Television Stations on the stations' subchannels. Later that year, A+E Networks acquired Lifetime Entertainment Services with DATG ownership increasing to 42%. In November, Disney-ABC sells GMTV to ITV for $37 million.

On March 24, 2012, following the dissolution of the ABC Daytime division, ABC Family Worldwide began taking operational control of Soapnet until that network was slowly discontinued for Disney Junior.

In July 2012, NBCUniversal confirmed plans to sell its 15.8% stake in A+E Networks to Disney for $3 billion (along with its previous owner Hearst Entertainment & Syndication, who became 50-50 partners in the joint venture).

On August 21, 2013, Disney–ABC announced it will lay off 175 employees. The layoffs are expected to hit positions among technical operations as well as the unit's eight local stations. On October 28, ABC News and Univision Communications launched Fusion, a cable Hispanic news and satire channel.

In August 2014, A+E took a 10% stake in Vice Media for $250 million, then announced in April 2015 that H2 would be rebranded into the Vice channel with an indicated early 2016 launch. Disney also directly made two $200 investments in Vice Media in November 2015, then a week later in December, they directly invested in it again for 10% to assist in funding its programming. ABC Family became Freeform on January 12, 2016.

On April 21, 2016, Disney–ABC sold its share in Fusion to Univision. In September 2016, the group's president Ben Sherwood named Bruce Rosenblum, Television Academy chairman and former head of Warner Bros. TV Group, as president of business operations in s the newly created position, to reduce the number of direct reports from 17 to about 8. Roseblum would oversee ad sales in conjunction with channel heads, affiliate sales and marketing, engineering, digital media, global distribution, IT, research and strategy and business development. This allows Sherwood to focus on content and direct operating units that continue to directly report to him, ABC network units, cable channel units (Disney Channels Worldwide, and Freeform), ABC Studios and ABC TV Stations.

With the March 14, 2018, Disney Company reorganization, in anticipation of integrating Fox assets from a proposed acquisition, all international channels including Disney Channels have been transferred to Walt Disney Direct-to-Consumer and International, a new segment, with US channels remaining with Disney–ABC Television Group. All global sales units and distribution units have been transfer to the Disney Direct-to-Consumer segment.

Walt Disney Television

On October 8, 2018, Disney announced the division would be renamed into the second incarnation of Walt Disney Television following the completion of its acquisition of 21st Century Fox. The acquisition added 20th Century Fox Television, FX Networks and FX Productions, Fox 21 Television Studios, and National Geographic Global Networks to the division. Fox television executives Peter Rice, Dana Walden, John Landgraf, and Gary Knell joined The Walt Disney Company on March 20, 2019.

On March 5, 2019, Craig Hunegs was named to lead the combined Disney Television Studios — ABC Studios, ABC Signature, 20th Century Fox Television and Fox 21 Television Studios. He would report to Walden.

Following the completed acquisition of the 21st Century Fox assets in March 2019, Disney reorganized its television division to align various operations. On June 10, 2019, Disney announced that both Disney Television Studios and FX Entertainment would share the same casting division. After assuming full control over Hulu in May 2019, Disney reorganized Hulu's reporting structure in July 2019, placing Hulu's Scripted Originals team under Walt Disney Television. Under the new structure, Hulu's SVP of Original Scripted Content would report directly to the chairman of Disney Television Studios and ABC Entertainment.

On August 10, 2020, Disney Television Studios rebranded all of its three studios as part of merger terms which required dropping the "Fox" name from assets acquired from 21st Century Fox, with 20th Century Fox Television becoming 20th Television; Fox 21 Television Studios became the second incarnation of Touchstone Television to avoid brand confusion with Fox Corporation; and ABC Studios merged with the original incarnation of ABC Signature Studios to form the current ABC Signature. In addition, the original syndication arm of 20th Century Fox Television also called "20th Television" was folded into Disney-ABC Domestic Television.

Disney General Entertainment Content 
On October 12, 2020 the division was rechristened as  Disney General Entertainment Content.

In December 2020, Touchstone Television merged into 20th Television.

On February 3, 2021, Disney Television Studios established a new unit known as "Walt Disney Television Alternative", which will be headed by former senior vice president of alternative, specials and late-night series at ABC, Rob Mills, to oversee the development of non-scripted programming.

Leadership
 Dana Walden, Co-Chairman, Disney Entertainment
 Steve Chung, Chief Legal Officer
 Sonia Coleman, Senior Vice President, Human Resources
 Craig Erwich, President, Disney Television Group and Hulu Originals
 Ayo Davis, President, Disney Branded Television
 Sharon Klein, Executive Vice President, Casting
 Rob Mills, Executive Vice President, Unscripted and Alternative Entertainment
 Simran Sethi, Executive Vice President, Programming and Content Strategy, ABC Entertainment and Freeform
 Kimberly Godwin, President, ABC News
 John Landgraf, Chairman, FX, National Geographic and Onyx Collective
 Gina Balian, President, FX Entertainment
 Tara Duncan, President, Onyx Collective
 Nick Grad, President, FX Entertainment
 Stephanie Gibbons, President, Creative, Strategy and Digital, Multi-Platform Marketing, FX
 Courteney Monroe, President, Content, National Geographic
 Debra O'Connell, President, Networks
 Chad Matthews, President, ABC Owned Television Stations
 Shannon Ryan, President, Marketing
 Naomi Bulochnikov-Paul, Executive Vice President, Publicity, and Head of Communications
 Pamela Levine, Head of Marketing, Disney Branded Television and National Geographic Global Networks
 Eric Schrier, President, Disney Television Studios
 Karey Burke, President, 20th Television
 Jonnie Davis, President, ABC Signature
 Trisha Husson, Head of Strategy, Business Operations and Finance, Disney General Entertainment Content
 Marci Proietto, Executive Vice President, 20th Television Animation

Units

Current structure

, the following are the current units based on reporting structure:

Former units
Transferred to Disney Media and Entertainment Distribution (DMED)
 Disney XD
 ABC Owned Television Stations

Re-organizational transfers 2018
These assets were transferred to Walt Disney Direct-to-Consumer & International (now Disney Media and Entertainment Distribution) in 2018, which include:
 Walt Disney Studios Home Entertainment – formerly Buena Vista Home Entertainment
 Disney–ABC Domestic Television – also known as Disney–ABC Home Entertainment and Television Distribution and formerly Buena Vista Television
 Disney Media Distribution – formerly Disney–ABC International Television and before that, ABC Cable and International Broadcast Group
 Disney Branded Television - international channels only
 Broadcast Satellite Disney Co., Ltd. (April 2009–2018) – operator of Dlife channel (Japan)
 Hungama TV (2006–2018)
 Buena Vista International Television Investments
 RTL Disney Television Limited Partnership, 50% (–2018)
 Tele Munich Television Media Participation Limited Partnership, 50%
 RTL 2 Television Limited Partnership, 31.5% (1994–2018)
 RTL II (Germany)
 Super RTL (1995–2021) Germany
 Kividoo subscription video-on-demand (2015)
 Toggo Plus (2016)

Others
 ABC Radio Networks (1945–2007) sold to Cumulus Media
 American Contemporary Network (January 1, 1968)
 American Information Network (January 1, 1968)
 American Entertainment Network (January 1, 1968)
 American FM Network	(January 1, 1968)
 ABC Rock Radio Network (January 4, 1982) 	
 ABC Direction Radio Network (January 4, 1982) 	 	
 ABC Talk Radio (1980s)
 Urban Advantage Network (UAN)
 Radio Disney Group (2003–2014) sold individual stations except one.
 Walt Disney Television (1999–2003)
 Disney MovieToons/Disney Video Premieres (1996–2003) launched as a part of Disney TV Animation; transferred out to Walt Disney Feature Animation (now Walt Disney Animation Studios).
 DIC Entertainment, L.P. (1996–2000) sold back to Andy Heyward.
 Jetix – merged into Disney Channels Worldwide (now Disney Branded Television).
 ABC News Now (2004–2009) digital subchannel network.
 Touchstone Television (2020) folded into 20th Television

Walt Disney Television and Telecommunications

Walt Disney Television and Telecommunications (WDTT) was a division of The Walt Disney Company. At the time Disney and Capital Cities/ABC merged, WDTT's divisions were The Disney Channel, KCAL-TV Los Angeles, Walt Disney Television, Touchstone Television, Buena Vista Home Entertainment, and Disney Interactive.

WDTT history
On August 24, 1994, with Jeffrey Katzenberg's resignation, a reorganization of Disney took place in which Richard H. Frank became head of newly formed Walt Disney Television and Telecommunications, which was split from its filmed entertainment business, Walt Disney Studios. On December 5, 1994, Walt Disney Computer Software was transferred within WDTT as Disney Interactive. At the end of his contract on April 30, 1995, Frank left Disney. Dennis Hightower, a marketing executive, was appointed by April 9 to succeed Frank.

In April 1996, due to ongoing post-Disney-CC/ABC merger realignment and the retirement of Hightower as president, WDTT's divisions were reassigned to other groups, with most of them transferred to either The Walt Disney Studios or CC/ABC. KCAL was sold to Young Broadcasting in May 1996 due to CC/ABC ownership of KABC-TV.

See also
Fox Networks Group

Notelist

References

External links

1985 establishments in California
Broadcasting companies of the United States
Disney Media Networks
Mass media companies established in 1985
American Broadcasting Company
General Entertainment
American companies established in 1985
1996 mergers and acquisitions
Owned-and-operated television stations in the United States
Companies based in Burbank, California
Cable network groups in the United States
Television production companies of the United States